Asgarli (also Romanized as ‘Asgarlī; also known as ‘Askarlī and ‘Asgarlū) is a village in Jafarabad Rural District, Jafarabad District, Qom County, Qom Province, Iran. At the 2006 census, its population was 441, in 104 families.

References 

Populated places in Qom Province